Opharus is a genus of moths in the family Erebidae. The genus was erected by Francis Walker in 1855.

Species

Opharus aeschista (Dognin, 1911)
Opharus agramma (Dognin, 1906)
Opharus albiceps (Dognin, 1901)
Opharus albijuncta Rothschild, 1916
Opharus almopia (Druce, 1890)
Opharus aurogutta (Schaus, 1896)
Opharus basalis Walker, 1856
Opharus belus Druce, 1897
Opharus bimaculata (Dewitz, 1877)
Opharus bipunctatus Vincent & Laguerre, 2009
Opharus brasiliensis Vincent & Laguerre, 2009
Opharus calosoma (Dyar, 1913)
Opharus consimilis Hampson, 1901
Opharus conspicuus Druce, 1906
Opharus cortica (Walker, 1856)
Opharus euchaetiformis H. Edwards, 1884
Opharus fallax Toulgoët, 2002
Opharus flavicostata Dognin, 1901
Opharus flavimaculata Hampson, 1901
Opharus franclemonti Watson & Goodger, 1986
Opharus gemma Schaus, 1894
Opharus immanis (H. Edwards, 1884)
Opharus insulsa (Dognin, 1902)
Opharus intermedia Rothschild, 1909
Opharus laudia (Druce, 1890)
Opharus lehmanni (Rothschild, 1910)
Opharus linus Druce, 1897
Opharus lugubris Toulgoët, 1981
Opharus momis (Dyar, 1912)
Opharus morosa Schaus, 1892
Opharus muricolor (Dyar, 1898)
Opharus navatteae Toulgoët, 2000
Opharus nigrocinctus Rothschild, 1935
Opharus notata (Schaus, 1892)
Opharus omissoides Toulgoët, 1981
Opharus palmeri Druce, 1909
Opharus picturata (Burmeister, 1878)
Opharus polystrigata Hampson, 1901
Opharus procroides Walker, 1855
Opharus quadripunctata (Schaus, 1910)
Opharus rema (Dognin, 1891)
Opharus rhodosoma (Butler, 1876)
Opharus roseistriga Schaus, 1910
Opharus rudis (Schaus, 1911)
Opharus subflavus Toulgoët, 1981
Opharus trama (Dognin, 1894)
Opharus tricyphoides (Rothschild, 1909)

References

 
Moth genera